The following lists events that happened in 2015 in Iraq.

Incumbents
 President: Fuad Masum
 Prime Minister: Haider al-Abadi
 Vice President: Nouri al-Maliki, Usama al-Nujayfi, Ayad Allawi

Events

January
 January 6 – Clashes with ISIL in Al Anbar Governorate kill twenty-three Iraqi Army soldiers and allied Sunni fighters.
 January 8 – A suicide bomber targets a police checkpoint in the town of Youssifiyah, killing seven people.

February
 February 7 – Bombings in Baghdad kill at least 37 people hours before the city's curfew was due to end. ISIL claims responsibility.
 February 9 – Several attacks, including a suicide bombing, kill at least 22 in Baghdad, Iraq, in a predominantly Shiite part of the capital.
 February 26 – ISIL posts a video showing the destruction of Mosul Museum, the second largest in Iraq and rich in artifacts from thousands of years of Iraqi history.
 February 28 – A series of car bombs kill 19 people in Balad Ruz, east-central Iraq.

March
 March 2 – A coalition of Iraqi Armed Forces and militia numbering around 30,000 launches an offensive against Islamic State positions in Tikrit. Troops seize control of the district of al-Tin and al-Abeid.
 March 5 – Separate attacks in Baghdad kill at least eight people.
 March 7 – ISIL destroys the ancient city of Hatra following the destruction of Nimrud.

April
 April 8 – The Iraqi Ministry of Tourism reports that Bash Tapia Castle was destroyed by ISIL.

July
 July 17 – A car bomb in Khan Bani Saad killed 130 people injuring at least 130 more.
 July 31 – national protests

December
 December 8 – The Catholic University in Erbil is founded.

Scheduled
 The Iraqi Kurdistan presidential elections will take place.

Deaths

References

 
2010s in Iraq
Years of the 21st century in Iraq
Iraq
Iraq